"Age of Ultron" (abbreviated AU) is a 2013 comic book fictional crossover storyline published by Marvel Comics that involved the conquest of the Earth by the sentient robot tyrant Ultron. The storyline consisted of an eponymous, 10-issue core miniseries, and a number of tie-in books.

The storyline was published between March and June 2013 and featured a storyline by Brian Michael Bendis. Artist Bryan Hitch provided the art for issues one through five, and Brandon Peterson for issues six through nine. Other artists who contributed to the series include Carlos Pacheco and Joe Quesada, the latter of whom drew part of the final issue.

Marvel stated that all art for the series was completed before it was solicited, ensuring deadlines were met and that there were no more than thirteen tie-ins to the four-month event.

This story takes place on two different Earths: the alternate Earth where Ultron annihilated humanity is referred to as Earth-61112, and the alternate reality where Morgan le Fay took over half the world is referred to as Earth-26111.

A sequel, Cataclysm, was released later in 2013.

The story arc served as an inspiration for the Marvel Cinematic Universe (MCU) film Avengers: Age of Ultron (2015), although the film does not directly adapt the events of the storyline. A free adaptation of the storyline's events later appeared in the MCU animated series What If...? (2021).

Publication history

In 2011, Avengers Vol. 4 No. 12.1 featured a storyline where the Intelligencia find a crash-landed Spaceknight and try to power it back up. During a fight with the Avengers while they try to rescue Spider-Woman, the Spaceknight is powered up, revealing that it was Ultron in disguise. Ultron escapes, setting up the events of Age of Ultron.

In mid-November, 2012, Marvel Comics released a cryptic teaser written "Age of Ultron" in binary code. Three days later the event was officially announced, although by this point it had been over a year since the event had been originally announced. The first of ten issues written by Brian Michael Bendis was released in March 2013 and ran through June of the same year.

Neil Gaiman's Angela character was introduced into the Marvel Universe in the last issue of the Age of Ultron miniseries, although the issue was shipped in a polybag to prevent other details of the story's ending from being publicized too early. An Age of Ultron #10 A.I. one-shot by writer Mark Waid and artist Andre Lima Araujo will delve into the repercussions of the storyline for Hank Pym. Following the conclusion of Age of Ultron, a new ongoing series titled Avengers A.I. by writer Sam Humphries and Andre Lima Araujo will launch in July.

Plot

Main story
New York is in ruins. Ultron has returned and taken over the world, with Ultron Sentinels guarding the streets and looking for fugitives. After rescuing Spider-Man from the Owl and Hammerhead, Hawkeye takes him to an underground area beneath Central Park, where a small handful of other heroes have taken refuge. Captain America has the idea to offer a hero to Ultron to be captured to infiltrate his base; Luke Cage and She-Hulk volunteer and Cage delivers She-Hulk to Ultron's forces. Cage is shocked when he discovers that they are going to negotiate with the Vision instead of Ultron. The Vision reveals that Ultron is acting from the future using him as a conduit. She-Hulk is killed freeing Cage and the other superheroes flee Manhattan. Cage later dies from radiation poisoning, but is able to tell the heroes what he learned about Ultron.

Meanwhile in San Francisco, a disfigured Black Widow meets with Moon Knight in one of Nick Fury's old bases to search for fail-safe plans Fury had for different apocalyptic scenarios. The heroes regroup in the Savage Land, and Black Widow arrives with Moon Knight and Red Hulk, and they reveal Fury had a fail-safe plan to defeat Ultron should he conquer the world. The heroes meet with Fury, whose plan is to use Doctor Doom's Time Platform to go into the future to defeat Ultron before he attacks the present. Iron Man, Captain America, Nick Fury, Red Hulk, Storm, Quake and Quicksilver go into the future, but Wolverine goes into the past to kill Henry Pym before he can create Ultron, and is followed by the Invisible Woman. The Invisible Woman attempts to convince Wolverine to reconsider his plan, but he reminds her of the crimes Ultron will commit and kills Pym.

The two return to the present to find the Savage Land covered in crashed ships, as in this timeline the war between the Kree and the Skrulls came to Earth. They go to New York and find it patrolled by three Helicarriers, and are attacked by the Defenders, who believe the two are Skrulls. A cyborg Iron Man scans their minds and sees their timeline, and explains that the Avengers broke up after Pym's death and magic became triumphant over technology, and Morgan le Fay has conquered half the world. The two attempt to break out of the Defenders' Helicarrier when Morgan le Fey attacks with a swarm of Doombots. During the battle, le Fey crashes the other two Helicarriers into New York. Most of the heroes are killed, and a dying Iron Man tells Wolverine he cannot go back in time to try and correct this again, as time is like a living organism that will break if ripped too much.

In the past, the previous Wolverine is about to kill Pym when the new Wolverine stops him, and warns him that killing Pym will result in a disaster worse than Ultron. Pym says he will simply not build Ultron, but Wolverine realizes he must preserve the original timeline, and Pym decides to instead install a fail-safe to destroy Ultron when the time comes. The Invisible Woman and the two Wolverines go to the Savage Land, and the present Wolverine has his past self kill him, since he does not want to live with memories of the ruined future. Months before Ultron's attack, Pym is working in his lab when he is given a package from the Invisible Woman: a recording of his past self, which he had somehow forgotten about, explaining an algorithm to destroy Ultron. The Avengers attack the headquarters of the Intelligencia to rescue Spider-Woman, the event that originally led to Ultron's reactivation. Once Ultron serves his purpose in the attack, Pym gives Iron Man the algorithm and it is uploaded into Ultron, destroying him.

Wolverine and the Invisible Woman return to the present and find New York back to normal, but a massive shockwave across time and space seemingly shatters reality before putting it back together. At Avengers Tower, Giant-Man, Iron Man and Beast theorize that Wolverine's time travel journeys caused too much stress to the space-time continuum and has created tears across the multiverse. In the Ultimate Marvel universe, Miles Morales is out as Spider-Man when a flash of light reveals Galactus. High above Earth, Angela appears vowing revenge on whoever has pulled her from her world. In his lab, Pym has a realization on what went wrong and how he must fix it.

Pym, having learned the full scope of events, reflects on his life and his personal struggles between pursuing practical scientific matters or whimsical flights of fancy. He contemplates suicide when he considers that his scientific pursuits resulted in the world's destruction by Ultron, but realizes that the future where Ultron was not created was worse, and takes this as proof he can be a force for positive change in the world. Thus he rededicates himself to superheroics as Ant-Man, a decision that satisfies both sides of his curiosity. In an epilogue, Pym looks upon an artificial intelligence built in the likeness of Doctor Doom, leading into the events of Avengers A.I.

Tie-in books
While traveling through time and space, the Fantastic Four are contacted by the Black Panther, who informs them that Ultron has taken over the Earth with an army of Ultron Sentinels. After returning to Earth, the team discovers that Manhattan is almost in ruins. While looking for survivors, they are attacked by the Ultron Sentinels. Mister Fantastic, the Human Torch, and the Thing seemingly die in the attack while the Invisible Woman escapes with She-Hulk where they join the resistance.

While visiting her old friends George Smith (the former Stunt-Master) and Richard Fenster in San Francisco, Black Widow was spending the day with them. When a squadron of Ultron Sentinels start attacking San Francisco and killing people, Richard becomes one of the victims while Black Widow and George escape. Afterwards, George Smith's tech-prosthetic arm fell under Ultron's control and he started obeying Ultron. Black Widow was forced to kill George Smith and was partially disfigured in the process. Captain Marvel is vacationing in London when the Ultron Sentinels invade. She fights them alongside Captain Britain and MI-13. After Computer Graham and Magic Boots Mel are killed, Captain Marvel and Captain Britain sacrifice their lives to destroy Ultron's main forces in London.

Victor Mancha was bringing some children to one of the Runaways' old bases in Los Angeles. Victor believes that if he uses his machine abilities, he will help Ultron’s victory. He does not tell any of his new-found friends about his background because he is afraid they will not accept him. In a flashback, it is shown that his Runaways teammates were all killed by Ultron and that Victor has stored digital versions of them in his memory banks, but these files seem to be corrupted since they are telling him to become more machine and less human. The Ultron Sentinels find the hideout and start killing some of the kids whom Victor had saved. Victor decides to fight the Ultron Sentinels, deciding that if this is the end he will go down fighting.

After being rescued by Hawkeye, Otto Octavius (whose mind secretly took over Spider-Man's body weeks before Ultron's attack) reflects on how the world has gone bad following Ultron's invasion. Iron Man finds him and persuades him to assist the heroes. Octavius' work at Horizon Labs could be a key element in defeating Ultron. While the heroes are planning a way to get into Ultron's fortress, Iron Man reveals to Otto a device he had developed during the time when he was the Director of S.H.I.E.L.D. The device in question can send a determined area through a portal into the Negative Zone, but lacks the Negative Zone tech to build the central device. The Baxter Building, which would have had the tech they needed, is gone, but Iron Man reveals that Max Modell has some of it at Horizon Labs. They plan to get inside Horizon so Otto can build the Central Device while Quicksilver places the remaining parts around Ultron's fortress. Otto and Quicksilver reach Horizon Labs, where Max Modell had died. Otto decides to prepare his own counter-plan instead of staying with Iron Man's plan. After activating his Spider-Bot and luring Ultron's minions to the lab, Otto uses his Spider-Bots to gain control over the Ultron Sentinels. He plans to use the Ultron Sentinels to infiltrate Ultron's fortress and defeat him. While reaching through what he believes is Ultron, Otto senses the pain and agony in the central unit is suffering. Otto suddenly realizes that it is not Ultron, but someone being manipulated by him. Ultron's defenses push Otto outside making him lose control of the Ultron Sentinels, forcing him to escape.

After time-traveling to the past, and immediately after stealing Nick Fury's hovercar, Wolverine and Invisible Woman discuss the plan of confronting Henry Pym about his creation of Ultron, with Invisible Woman reminding Wolverine that they must keep their actions at a minimum or risk causing a massive butterfly effect. In the middle of the trip, their car breaks down, so they locate an underground S.H.I.E.L.D. base to find an energy cell for the car and return to their mission. Upon entering the base, they take separate paths with Wolverine heading for the energy cell while the Invisible Woman searches for Henry Pym's location. Wolverine bumps into a laboratory where a Brood creature was contained. Wolverine breaks it out of its confinement, but it attacks him and attempts to procreate inside his body. Wolverine fights the Brood creature and removes its offspring from his body. He then discovers that the other Brood creatures in the laboratory have started to evolve and adapt from the damage inflicted by Wolverine's attacks. Meanwhile, the Invisible Woman breaks into the surveillance room to find Henry Pym's location. She discovers that S.H.I.E.L.D. has been monitoring every location, including the Baxter Building. She then starts having doubts about crossing the line and wonders if she should tell the past version of Mister Fantastic that S.H.I.E.L.D. has been monitoring him. Once their work is done, they both leave the S.H.I.E.L.D. base and head off to search for Pym with the roles reversed: Logan attempting to reason with Pym and Sue determined to do whatever it takes.

During the Apocalypse Twins' adolescences, Kang the Conqueror brings them from concentration camps to his palace in the year A.D. 4145. They are then dispatched on a mission to murder Colonel America at the time when history was altered by Wolverine and the Invisible Woman. The Apocalypse Twins' mission fails but they succeed in killing that reality's Havok and Rogue, who were the first lives they ever took. As punishment for their failure, Kang sends the Twins back to the concentration camps.

In the divergent timeline created by Henry Pym's death, Morgana le Fey and her husband Doctor Doom conquer half the planet. Le Fey and Doom's daughter Caroline recruits Hippolyta to seek revenge for abandoning her as a child. In Latveria, Caroline and Hippolyta discover that Doctor Doom has died and has been replaced by Hippolyta's father Ares. Hippolyta defeats Ares and takes back command of the Amazons (who were subdued by Ares).

Titles involved

Collected editions

Other versions

What If?
There is a five-issue What If? miniseries centered on the Age of Ultron storyline, four issues looking at what would have happened if one of the other original five Avengers - counting Captain America rather than the Hulk as a founder - had died instead of Pym, and a fifth looking at a world where Pym is the last surviving human under Ultron's reign. It is collected in paperback.

Secret Wars (2015)
The Ultron portion of the Age of Ultron appeared in the 2015 Secret Wars storyline as part of the series Age of Ultron vs. Marvel Zombies. The Age of Ultron's domain of Battleworld is called Perfection where it, the Deadlands (Marvel Zombies), and New Xandar (Annihilation Wave) are separated from the other Battleworld domains by the Wall, which keeps them contained from the other realities due to the dangers of their worlds. It is later established that this is not the Age of Ultron seen in the original storyline, but another world in which Ultron killed Pym immediately after achieving sentience. It eliminated Dane Whitman when he tried to infiltrate the Masters of Evil and killed the Avengers before creating a drone army that overwhelmed the remaining heroes. Although the zombies and the Ultron drones eventually form an alliance by combining the two "species", a resistance to Ultron exists in the Deadlands, led by surviving heroes the Vision, Wonder Man, and Jim Hammond, who gather those exiled beyond the Wall into a secure city they have established. They eventually manage to rescue a version of Hank Pym exiled from a Wild-West-era zone. He is able to use his counterpart's notes to devise a means of shutting down the hive mind of Ultron's drones at the cost of sacrificing the Vision and Wonder Man. Wonder Man's android lover is reconfigured so that she can die in Hammond's place.

In other media

Film
 The Marvel Cinematic Universe film Avengers: Age of Ultron features Ultron as the titular main antagonist but the film is not based on the comic book, simply borrowing its title. Nevertheless, the film does include a similarity from the comic, wherein the Avengers are driven underground by Ultron.

Television 
 Season one of the animated Marvel Cinematic Universe / Disney+ series What If...? (2021) features an adaptation of the "Age of Ultron" storyline. In an alternate timeline depicted in the episode "What If... Ultron Won?", Ultron is successful during the events of Avengers: Age of Ultron; he transfers his consciousness into Vision's body and launches a nuclear holocaust that kills the human race, including most of the Avengers. He later kills Thanos and obtains all the Infinity Stones, using them to extend his campaign of destruction to other planets. After eliminating all life in the universe, Ultron feels that he no longer has a purpose, until he learns about the Watcher and the existence of other realities. After fighting the Watcher in the Nexus of All Realities, Ultron gains access to the entire Multiverse, and begins travelling to other timelines in order to destroy them as well. In the following episode, "What If... the Watcher Broke His Oath?", the Watcher assembles the Guardians of the Multiverse (consisting of alternate reality versions of Doctor Strange, Peggy Carter, T'Challa, Thor, Erik Killmonger, and Gamora, with a variant of Natasha Romanoff later joining them as well) to stop Ultron, and they ultimately manage to defeat him by uploading Arnim Zola's mind into his body, allowing Zola to delete Ultron's consciousness and take control of his body. Zola then tries to take the Infinity Stones for himself, and fights Killmonger, who wants to use the Stones to fix his own universe, but both are frozen in a pocket dimension by Strange and the Watcher. With the Multiverse saved, Strange resolves to guard Zola and Killmonger, while each Guardian returns to their native realities (excluding Romanoff, whom the Watcher brings to a universe where most of the Avengers were killed so that she could help the remaining heroes there).

References

External links
 
 Age of Ultron trailer at YouTube

Marvel Comics storylines
2013 comics debuts
Post-apocalyptic comics
Comics about parallel universes
Comics by Brian Michael Bendis
Comics set in New York City